Pirates at Ocean's Edge is  Wizkids ninth expansion in the Pirates of the Spanish Main series.  This set was released in April 2007. It features giant crabs, prehistoric sharks and sea dragons.  It also features the return of the junk ship from Pirates of the South China Seas and galleys from Pirates of the Barbary Coast. Three new ship types, Windcatchers, Sea Dragons and Catamarans, were added as well. A new terrain feature, whirlpools creates an additional navigation hazard.  Along with being sold in the traditional booster pack format, the set also feature new two-player Mega-Packs, which are currently the only way to get sea dragons, windcatchers or catamarans.  The story has been developed. Davy Jones, from Pirates of Davy Jones' Curse has returned with more power. Also a number of ships from South China Seas have been converted to English, French or Cursed.  There is a new promotion, a Pirate 10-masted Junk, the Zeus, linked to Emperor Blackheart (often listed as 'King Blackheart'), as well as some other ships.

Set details 
This is the first set to feature 32 Islands instead of the customary 16.

This set featured some new Mechanics:
 Titan—Keyword that allows a card to move across land and water, and to carry crew.
 Whirlpool—new terrain that teleports ships from one whirlpool to another with the risk of losing masts, crew or treasure.
 Sea Dragon- has many new abilities including unlimited movement, and two types of attacks. But it cannot be repaired. Strangely this card being a monster from the sea doesn't have the submerge ability. This is probably because it has wings.
 Windcatcher—Keyword that allows movement to be measured from the bow or the stern of the boat.
 Catamaran—Keyword that grants defensive abilities including an extra hull piece that must be removed before masts are removed, and the ability to turn a hit into a miss on a die roll of 5 or 6.

Notable ships
Zeus-The largest Pirate ship in the game, and one of 6 ten masters. (For now) It is the cheapest of all 6 10 mast ships, and was formerly the Baochuan. It is assumed that its captain, Zheng He, was killed in the attack by the newly crowned Emperor Blackheart. 

Divine Dragon-
A new Cursed ship risen from the ocean depths by the power of El Fantasma. Its ability gives it all rank 3 cannons against all non-Cursed ships for a price of only 16 points. 

Ghost Walker-
A new American windcatcher ship (one of two). It is a special project conducted by the Americans. A prototype was stolen by the pirates, however. The Ghost Walker has the ability to cancel one ability per turn. 

Shal-Bala-Is a Cursed dragon, which is one of Davy Jones' most powerful underlings. 

Brachyura-
A cursed titan crab. There are two different Brachyuras that are exactly the same, except that there is a super rare version with 'glitters'.

HMS Grand Temple - Rare, English 6 mast ship with very accurate cannons (2 of them are ranked 3 with range S and 4 ranked 2 with range L). Quite fast (S+S) and with capacity 3, ideal for crew (Pirate crew may use their abilities on it) and with ability Junk (ship's masts aren't blocking her line of fire).

Notable Crew
Davy Jones - this crew, a "power up" from Pirates of Davy Jones' Curse, is always able to give an extra action, either to you or your opponent.
Calico Cat - this crew, a "power up" from Pirates of the Spanish Main and Pirates of the South China Seas,  is both a "World Hater" and gives you an extra action on a roll of a 5 or 6.  These two abilities are normally worth 9 points, but Calico Cat only costs 6 points.
Crimson Angel - this crew is both a "World Hater" and gives you the same action twice on a roll of a 5 or 6.  These two abilities are normally worth 7 points, but Crimson Angel only costs 5 points.
Emperor Blackheart -He has the same ability as the new Davy Jones. He is the first crew out of 3 that is not required to be on his linked ship, the Zeus.

Other
This game features the return of the Acorazado. The Spanish battleship is no longer the most powerful ship of Spain. In Oceans Edge it has been refitted with harpoons to hunt seamonsters.
The Deliverance returns but under a new captain, the Crimson Angel, who tricked Blackheart into giving the vessel to her. It is considered a powerful gunship if coupled with its linked crew.

References 

  Pirates at Ocean's Edge announcement
 Pirates at Ocean's Edge Sneak Peek #1
 Pirates at Ocean's Edge Sneak Peek #2

Ocean's Edge